Rocío del Carmen Morgan Franco (born 12 March 1967) is a Mexican politician from the National Action Party. She has served as Deputy of the LVII and LX Legislatures of the Mexican Congress representing Jalisco.

References

1967 births
Living people
Politicians from Monterrey
Women members of the Chamber of Deputies (Mexico)
National Action Party (Mexico) politicians
20th-century Mexican politicians
20th-century Mexican women politicians
21st-century Mexican politicians
21st-century Mexican women politicians
Deputies of the LX Legislature of Mexico
Members of the Chamber of Deputies (Mexico) for Jalisco